Morven Township, population 2,065, is one of eight townships in Anson County, North Carolina,  United States. Morven Township contains the towns of Morven and McFarlan within it.

Geography
Jones Creek and North Fork of Jones Creek forms the northern boundary of Morven Township.  The central part of the township is drained by the Pee Dee River and its tributary, Mill Creek.  The southeastern part of the township is drained by another Pee Dee River tributary, Whortenberry Creek.

References

Townships in Anson County, North Carolina
Townships in North Carolina